The Triumph of Steel is the seventh studio album by the American heavy metal band Manowar, released in 1992. It is the only Manowar album to feature guitarist David Shankle and drummer Kenny Earl "Rhino" Edwards. The cover art was illustrated by Ken Kelly.

Album content
"Achilles, Agony and Ecstasy in Eight Parts" is the longest (28 minutes and 38 seconds) and most complex Manowar song, and probably an anticipation of a concept album that was never accomplished. Because of its Homeric content, "Achilles, Agony and Ecstasy in Eight Parts" has attracted the attention of a group of scholars at Bologna University in Italy.  Mrs. Eleonora Cavallini, Professor in Classics, has written about this song:

"Joey DeMaio’s lyrics imply a careful and scrupulous reading of the Iliad. The songwriter has focused his attention essentially on the crucial fight between Hector and Achilles, has paraphrased some passages of the poem adapting them to the melodic structure with a certain fluency and partly reinterpreting them, but never altering or upsetting Homer’s storyline. The purpose of the lyrics (and of the music as well) is to evoke some characteristic Homeric sceneries: the raging storm of the battle, the barbaric, ferocious exultance of the winner, the grief and anguish of the warrior who feels death impending over him. The whole action hinges upon Hector and Achilles, who are represented as specular characters, divided by an irreducible hatred and yet destined to share a similar destiny. Both are caught in the moment of the greatest exaltation, as they savagely rejoice for the blood of their killed enemies, but also in the one of the extreme pain, when the daemon of war finally pounces on them. Furthermore, differently than in the irreverent and iconoclastic movie Troy, in "Achilles, Agony and Ecstasy in Eight Parts", the divine is a constant and ineluctable presence, determining human destinies with inscrutable and steely will, and, despite the generic reference to 'the gods', the real master of human lives is Zeus, the only God to whom both Hector and Achilles address their prayers"

Track listing 
All songs written by Joey DeMaio except where noted.

Personnel

Manowar
 Eric Adams – vocals
 David Shankle – guitars, acoustic guitar, classical guitar
 Joey DeMaio – bass, 4-string, 8-string bass, piccolo bass, bass pedals
 Kenny Earl "Rhino" Edwards – drums, percussion

Production
John Pettigrass - associate producer
Rich Breen - engineer
Dave Kresl, Doug McBride, Hank Neuberger, Dan Stout, Stefon Taylor, Bruce Breckenfeld, Andrew Rubin - mixing at Air Waves Studio, Chicago, IL
John McCortney, Paul Grigonis, Ehab Haddad - digital editing and transfers at C.R.C., Chicago, IL
Howie Weinberg - mastering at Masterdisk, New York
Silvio "The Don" Bonvini - production co-ordination

Charts

Certifications

References 

1992 albums
Manowar albums
Albums with cover art by Ken Kelly (artist)
Works based on the Iliad
Music based on works by Homer